Elbert Tuganov (22 February 1922 – 22 March 2007) was an Estonian animator and film director. He is known as "the father of Estonian animation".

Life
Tuganov was born in Baku, Azerbaijan to an Estonian mother and an Ossetian father. In 1946 he joined with Tallinnfilm. In 1958 he created the first Estonian animated film Peetrikese unenägu.

Animated films
In total he created 38 animated films.

 Peetrikese unenägu (1958)
 Põhjakonn (1959)
 Metsamuinasjutt (1960)
 Ott kosmoses (1961)
 Mina ja Murri (1961)
 Kaks lugu (1962)
 Peaaegu uskumatu lugu (1962)
 Just nii (1963)
 Hiirejaht (1965)
 Park (1966)
 Jonn (1966)
 Žanri sünd (1967)
 Ahvipoeg Fips (1968)
 Hammasratas (1968)
 Aatomik (1970)
 Aatomik ja Jõmmid (1970)
 Jalakäijad (1971)
 Suveniir (1977)
 Köpenicki kapten (1978)
 Kaupmees ja ahvid (1979)
 Giufa (1979)
 Ohver (1980)
 Õunkimmel (1981)

References

1922 births
2007 deaths
Estonian animators
Estonian film directors
Estonian animated film directors
Estonian screenwriters
Estonian people of Ossetian descent
Recipients of the Order of the White Star, 4th Class
People from Baku
20th-century screenwriters
Soviet animators
Soviet film directors
Burials at Pärnamäe Cemetery